Kosova Airlines is an airline that is based in Kosovo. The airline links Pristina to major European cities. The airline was established in the autumn of 2003 by the United Nations Interim Administration Mission in Kosovo (UNMIK) and the Kosovo Government. On 10 May 2006, the only aircraft in the Kosova Airlines fleet, a Boeing 737-700, which was wet leased from the German airline Hamburg International, was returned to that airline, and Kosova Airlines ceased operating flights. The airline, however, continues to work with other airline companies flying into Pristina.

Kosova Airlines Agency
Kosova Airlines (Eurokoha Reisen) is also the biggest tour agency in Kosovo, and offers charter flights to Pristina from destinations in Europe.

Kosova Airlines offers flights with these airlines from the following places:

SunExpress (Antalya)
Swiss International Air Lines (Zürich, Geneva)

Destinations
Kosova Airlines, during its time as an independent airline, flew to the following destinations:

 Austria
Innsbruck
Salzburg
 Germany
Berlin
Cologne
Düsseldorf
Frankfurt
Hamburg
Hanover
Munich
Stuttgart
 Italy
Bologna
Verona
 Kosovo
Pristina
 Malta
Luqa
 Switzerland
Geneva
Zürich
Basel
 Spain
Palma de Mallorca
Ibiza
 Turkey
Antalya

Fleet
 Fokker 50 (2)
 McDonnell Douglas MD-80 (1)
 Boeing 737-700 (1)

Livery
The livery of the leased aircraft was never painted in a full scheme. The aircraft has a dark blue tail like that on the original Hamburg International livery. In the middle of the tail was a dark yellow map of Kosovo. The fuselage was white and towards the cockpit had the Hamburg International logo. Underneath the passenger windows towards the cockpit side of the aircraft was written "Operated in cooperation with Kosova Airlines".

See also
 List of airlines of Kosovo

Notes and references
Notes

References

External links
Kosova Airlines official website
Fleet details of Kosova Airlines
Pictures of Kosova Airlines
Kosova Airlines

Airlines of Kosovo
Airlines established in 2003